The Capital Indoor Stadium is an indoor arena in 56 Zhongguancun South Street, Beijing, China that was built in 1968. It hosted matches between national table tennis teams of China and the United States in 1971; these matches were part of the exchange program known as ping pong diplomacy.

History
It has a capacity of 17,345 and a floor space of 54,707 square meters expanded from the old 53,000. It was renovated for the first time between 2000 to 2001 to become a venue for the 2001 Summer Universiade.

The stadium hosted one of the first NBA games in China, hosted on October 17, 2004 in front of a sellout capacity of 17,903.  It also hosted the first-ever professional football game featuring all-stars from the Arena Football League to help promote the new AFL China league (now known as the China Arena Football League.

Capital Indoor Stadium has undergone a new renovation and expansion that was completed in late 2007 for the 2008 Summer Olympics, where it hosted volleyball tournaments.

The venue is also used for figure skating and short track speed skating, which will also be used for the 2022 Winter Olympics.

See also
List of indoor arenas in China

References 

Venues of the 2008 Summer Olympics
Venues of the 2022 Winter Olympics
Indoor arenas in China
Sports venues in Beijing
Volleyball venues in China
Olympic volleyball venues
Olympic short track speed skating venues
Olympic figure skating venues
1968 establishments in China
Badminton venues
Venues of the 1990 Asian Games
Asian Games basketball venues